Biancheri is a surname of French or Italian origin. Notable people with the surname include:

 Franck Biancheri (minister) (born 1960), former foreign minister of Monaco
 Franck Biancheri (1961–2012), French politician
 Gabriel Biancheri (1943–2010), French politician
 Henri Biancheri (1932–2019), French footballer
 Admiral Luigi Biancheri (1891–1950), Italian naval commander during Operation Abstention in the Mediterranean in 1941
 Raoul Biancheri, Chancellor of several Orders of Monaco

See also